The Musée Bible et Terre Sainte (Bible and Holy Land Museum), also known as the Musée Biblique (Biblical Museum), is a small museum operated by the Institut Catholique de Paris, and located in the 6th arrondissement of Paris, France, at 21 rue d'Assas. It is open Saturday afternoons; admission is free.

History 
The museum was established in 1969 by Canon Leconte and Father J. Starcky, and is maintained by the "Bible et Terre Sainte" association. In 1994 it moved to its current premises. Today it contains over 500 cultural objects, arranged in chronological order, representing everyday life in Palestine from 5000 BCE to 600 CE. It is located within the courtyard to the left of the oratory, on the ground floor.

See also 
 List of museums in Paris

References 
 Musée "Bible et Terre Sainte"
 Paris.org description
 ParisInfo description (French)
 Paris.fr description (French)

 Museums of Paris description

Museums in Paris
Musee Bible Et Terre Sainte
Museums established in 1969
Musee Bible Et Terre Sainte
Archaeological museums in France